Douglas Ernest Ritchie (1905-1967) was a news editor at the BBC.

World War II
Ritchie, at the time an assistant news editor, broadcast to German-occupied countries during the war.  He adopted the moniker "Colonel Britton", and his identity was a closely guarded secret until after the war.

He was in charge of the BBC's wartime "V for Victory" campaign.

He created the "Continental V Army".

By the time of the disclosure of his identity in 1945 he was director of the European news department of the BBC.

Post war
After the end of the war Ritchie rose to the position of head of publicity at the BBC. At the age of 50 he suffered a stroke.

His book Stroke: A Diary Of Recovery was hailed by John O'Londons as "A triumph of the highest order".

References

1905 births
British broadcasters
Year of death missing